Ban Gonbad (also Romanized as Bān Gonbad) is a village in Cham Kabud Rural District, Sarab Bagh District, Abdanan County, Ilam Province, Iran. At the 2006 census, its population was 41, in 8 families. The village is populated by Kurds.

References 

Populated places in Abdanan County
Kurdish settlements in Ilam Province